The Granada Mosque is a mosque in Granada, Andalusia, Spain.

History
The construction of the mosque was started by the local Muslim community. It was then opened in summer 2003.

Architecture
The mosque building is designed with traditional Muslim motifs. The building complex consists of a garden and center for Islamic studies. The center consists of library, conference hall, exhibition area, bookshop and reception area.

Activities
The mosque regularly holds five daily prayers and Friday prayers. It also holds daily recitation and study of the Quran.

See also
 Islam in Spain

References

External links

  

2003 establishments in Spain
Buildings and structures in Granada
Mosques completed in 2003
Mosques in Spain